Boyesen is a surname. Notable people with the surname include:

Gerda Boyesen (1922-2005), Norwegian psychologist
Hjalmar Hjorth Boyesen (1848–1895), Norwegian-American author and college professor
Jens Boyesen (1920–1996), Norwegian diplomat and politician
Peter Bøyesen (1799–1867), Norwegian businessperson and politician
Pietro Boyesen (1819–1882), Danish photographer
Trygve Bøyesen (1886–1963), Norwegian gymnast